Monarchs of the British Isles are listed here, grouped by the type of death and then ordered by the date of death.  The monarchical status of some people is disputed, but they have been included here for completeness.

Natural causes 
Those monarchs that are assumed to have died through natural causes (through disease).

Killed

In battle
Those that died in battle either as the antagonist or otherwise.

Murdered, assassinated, executed or euthanised
Those that were murdered, assassinated, executed away from the battlefield, or euthanised by their doctors.

Other

Accidental death

Unknown

See also
 List of British monarchs by longevity

Notes

References

 Anderson, Alan Orr, Scottish Annals from English Chroniclers A.D. 500–1286. D. Nutt, London, 1908.
 Duncan, A.A.M., The Kingship of the Scots 842–1292: Succession and Independence. Edinburgh University Press, Edinburgh, 2002. 
 John of Fordun, Chronicle of the Scottish Nation, ed. William Forbes Skene, tr. Felix J.H. Skene, 2 vols. Reprinted, Llanerch Press, Lampeter, 1993. 
 McDonald, R. Andrew, Outlaws of Medieval Scotland: Challenges to the Canmore Kings, 1058–1266. Tuckwell Press, East Linton, 2003. 

Britain
 
 
 

Monarchs